Gary Brook (born 25 November 1968) is a former English cricketer.  Brook was a right-handed batsman who played primarily as a wicketkeeper.  He was born in Leeds, Yorkshire.

Brook's represented the Yorkshire Cricket Board in List A cricket.  His debut List A match came against Huntingdonshire in the 2000 NatWest Trophy.  From 2000 to 2001, he represented the Board in 4 List A matches, the last of which came against the Northamptonshire Cricket Board in the 2001 Cheltenham & Gloucester Trophy.  In his 4 List A matches, he batted twice, scoring 3 runs.  Behind the stumps he took 5 catches.

References

External links
Gary Brook at Cricinfo
Gary Brook at CricketArchive

1968 births
Living people
Cricketers from Leeds
English cricketers
Yorkshire Cricket Board cricketers
Wicket-keepers